Albiges/Mablep Rural LLG is a local-level government (LLG) of East Sepik Province, Papua New Guinea.

Wards
01. Iwam
02. Jikunumbu
03. Kulunge
04. Gongiora
05. Apangai
06. Ami
07. Amahup
08. Wamsak / Amom (Abu’ Arapesh language speakers)
09. Supari
10. Gwoingwon
11. Dahabiga
12. Kwelikum
13. Walahuta
14. Ningalimbi

References

Local-level governments of East Sepik Province